The Gloup is a collapsed sea cave in the Mull Head Nature Reserve in the islands of Orkney, Scotland.

The name derives from the Old Norse "gluppa", meaning a chasm. The cave is separated from the sea by a land bridge about 80 metres wide. It is approximately 40 metres long and 25 metres deep.

It is said that during the 19th and early 20th Centuries that old horses that were no longer fit to work on farms were led over the edge of The Gloup as a cheap and easy way to dispose of them.

It is on the east coast of the Deerness peninsula in the parish of St Andrews on the Orkney Mainland.

Landforms of Orkney
Sea caves
Caves of Scotland
Mainland, Orkney